is a national highway connecting Kyoto and Wakayama in Japan.

Route data
Length: 130.3 km (87.2 mi)
Origin: Kyoto (originates at junction with Routes 1, 8 and 9)
Terminus: Wakayama City (ends at Junction with Routes 26 and 42)
Major cities: Uji, Nara, Tenri, Kashihara, Yamatotakada, Gojō, Hashimoto, Iwade

History
4 December 1952 - First Class National Highway 24 (from Kyoto to Wakayama)
1 April 1965 - General National Highway 24 (from Kyoto to Wakayama)

Intersects with

Kyoto Prefecture
Nara Prefecture
Wakayama Prefecture

References

024
Roads in Kyoto Prefecture
Roads in Nara Prefecture
Roads in Wakayama Prefecture